Under the French Ancien Régime, a parlement was a provincial appellate court of the Kingdom of France. In 1789, France had 13 parlements, the oldest and most important of which was the Parlement of Paris. While both the modern French term parlement (for the legislature) and the English word parliament derive from this French term, the Ancien Régime parlements were not legislative bodies and the modern and ancient terminology are not interchangeable.

History
Parlements were judicial organizations consisting of a dozen or more appellate judges, or about 1,100 judges nationwide. They were the courts of final appeal of the judicial system, and typically wielded power over a wide range of subjects, particularly taxation. Laws and edicts issued by the Crown were not official in their respective jurisdictions until the parlements gave their assent by publishing them.

The members of the parlements were aristocrats, called nobles of the robe, who had bought or inherited their offices, and were independent of the King.

Sovereign councils with analogous attributes, more rarely called high councils or in one instance sovereign court, were created in new territories (notably in New France). Some of these were eventually replaced by parlements (e.g. the Sovereign Council of Navarre and Béarn and the Sovereign Court of Lorraine and Barrois). As noted by James Stephen:

From 1770 to 1774 the Chancellor of France, Maupeou, tried to abolish the Parlement of Paris in order to strengthen the Crown. However, when King Louis XV died in 1774, the parlements were reinstated. The parlements spearheaded the aristocracy's resistance to the absolutism and centralization of the Crown, but they worked primarily for the benefit of their own class, the French nobility. Alfred Cobban argues that the parlements were the chief obstacles to any reform before the Revolution, as well as the most formidable enemies of the French Crown. He concludes that the

Parlement of Paris, though no more in fact than a small, selfish, proud and venal oligarchy, regarded itself, and was regarded by public opinion, as the guardian of the constitutional liberties of France.

In November 1789, early in the French Revolution, all the parlements were suspended.

Name

The Old French word parlement is derived from the verb parler ('to speak') + suffix -(e)ment, and originally meant a "speaking". The meaning then became more specialized in French during the 13th century, to refer to the "curia regis in judicial session; sovereign court of justice" until the end of the Ancien Régime. (The sense of "legislative assembly" or "legislative body" was used in English, parliament, in the 14th century.)

Origin

The first parlement in Ancien Régime France developed in the 13th century out of the King's Council, and consequently enjoyed ancient, customary consultative and deliberative prerogatives.

Philippe le Bel was the first to fix this court to Paris, in 1302, officially severing it from the King's Council in 1307. The Parlement of Paris would hold sessions inside the medieval royal palace on the Île de la Cité, nowadays still the site in Paris of the Hall of Justice. The parlement also had the duty to record all royal edicts and laws. By the 15th century the Parlement of Paris had a right of "remonstrance to the king" (a formal statement of grievances), which was at first simply of an advisory nature.

In the meantime, the jurisdiction of the Parlement of Paris had been covering the entire kingdom as it was in the 14th century, but did not automatically advance in step with the Crown's ever expanding realm. In 1443, following the turmoil of the Hundred Years' War, King Charles VII of France granted Languedoc its own parlement by establishing the Parlement of Toulouse, the first parlement outside Paris; its jurisdiction extended over most of southern France. From 1443 until the French Revolution, several other parlements would be steadily created all over France ; these locations were provincial capitals of those provinces with strong historical traditions of independence before they were annexed to France (in some of these regions, provincial States-General also continued to meet and legislate with a measure of self-governance and control over taxation within their jurisdiction).

16th and 17th centuries
Over time, some parlements, especially the one in Paris, gradually acquired the habit of using their right of remonstrance to refuse to register legislation, which they adjudged as either untimely or contrary to the local customary law (and there were 300 customary law jurisdictions), until the king held a lit de justice or sent a lettre de jussion to force them to act. By the 16th century, the parlement judges were of the opinion that their role included active participation in the legislative process, which brought them into increasing conflict with the ever increasing monarchical absolutism of the Ancien Régime, as the lit de justice evolved during the 16th century from a constitutional forum to a royal weapon, used to force registration of edicts. The transmission of judicial offices had also been a common practice in France since the late Middle Ages; tenure on the court was generally bought from the royal authority; and such official positions could be made hereditary by paying a tax to the King called la paulette. Assembled in the parlements, the largely hereditary members, the provincial nobles of the robe were the strongest decentralizing force in a France that was more multifarious in its legal systems, taxation, and custom than it might have seemed under the apparent unifying rule of its kings. Nevertheless, the Parlement of Paris had the largest jurisdiction of all the parlements, covering the major part of northern and central France, and was simply known as "the parlement".

The Fronde
The Parlement of Paris played a major role in stimulating the nobility to resist the expansion of royal power by military force during the Fronde, 1648–1649. In the end, King Louis XIV won out and the nobility was humiliated.

The parlements' ability to withhold their assent by formulating remonstrances against the king's edicts forced the king to react, sometimes resulting in repeated resistance by the parlements, which the king could only terminate in his favour by issuing a lettre de jussion, and, in case of continued resistance, appearing in person in the parlement: the lit de justice. In such a case, the parlement's powers were suspended for the duration of this royal session. King Louis XIV moved to centralize authority into his own hands, imposing certain restrictions on the parlements: in 1665, he ordained that a lit de justice could be held without the king having to appear in person; in 1667, he limited the number of remonstrances to only one. In 1671–1673, however, the parlements resisted the taxes needed to fund the Franco-Dutch War. In 1673, the king imposed additional restrictions that stripped the parlements of any influence upon new laws by ordaining that remonstrances could only be issued after registration of the edicts. After Louis' death in 1715, all the restrictions were discontinued by the regent, although some of the judges of the Parlement of Paris accepted royal bribes to restrain that body until the 1750s.

Role leading to the French Revolution

After 1715, during the reigns of Louis XV and Louis XVI, the parlements repeatedly challenged the crown for control over policy, especially regarding taxes and religion. Furthermore, the parlements had taken the habit of passing arrêts de règlement, which were laws or regulatory decrees that applied within their jurisdiction for the application of royal edicts or of customary practices. At a session of the Parlement of Paris in 1766 known as the Flagellation Session,  Louis XV asserted that sovereign power resided in his person only.

In the years immediately before the start of the French Revolution in 1789, their extreme concern to preserve Ancien Régime institutions of noble privilege prevented France from carrying out many simple reforms, especially in the area of taxation, even when those reforms had the support of the king.

Chancellor René Nicolas de Maupeou sought to reassert royal power by suppressing the parlements in 1770. His famous attempts, known as Maupeou's Reform, resulted in a furious battle and failure. Parlements were disbanded and their members arrested. After Louis XV died, the parlements were restored.

The beginning of the proposed radical changes began with the protests of the Parlement of Paris addressed to Louis XVI in March 1776, in which the Second Estate, the nobility, resisted the beginning of certain reforms that would remove their privileges, notably their exemption from taxes. The objections were made in reaction to the essay, Réflexions sur la formation et la distribution des richesses ("Reflections on the Formation and Distribution of Wealth") by Anne-Robert-Jacques Turgot. The Second Estate reacted to the essay with anger to convince the king that the nobility still served a very important role and still deserved the same privileges of tax exemption as well as for the preservation of the guilds and corporations put in place to restrict trade, both of which were eliminated in the reforms proposed by Turgot.

In their remonstrance against the edict suppressing the corvée (March 1776), the Parlement of Paris – afraid that a new tax would replace the corvée, and that this tax would apply to all, introducing equality as a principle – dared to remind the king:

The personal service of the clergy is to fulfill all the functions relating to education and religious observances and to contribute to the relief of the unfortunate through its alms. The noble dedicates his blood to the defense of the state and assists the sovereign with his counsel. The last class of the nation, which cannot render such distinguished service to the state, fulfills its obligation through taxes, industry, and physical labor.

The Second Estate (the nobility) consisted of approximately 1.5% of France's population, and was exempt from almost all taxes, including the Corvée Royale, which was a recent mandatory service in which the roads would be repaired and built by those subject to the corvée. In practice, anyone who paid a small fee could escape the corvée, so this burden of labor fell only to the poorest in France. The Second Estate was also exempt from the gabelle, which was the unpopular tax on salt, and also the taille, a land tax paid by peasants, and the oldest form of taxation in France.

The Second Estate feared that it would have to pay the tax replacing the suppressed corvée. The nobles saw this tax as especially humiliating and below them, as they took great pride in their titles and their lineage, which often included those who had died in the defense of France. They saw this elimination of tax privilege as the gateway for more attacks on their rights and urged Louis XVI throughout the protests of the Parlement of Paris not to enact the proposed reforms.

These exemptions, as well as the right to wear a sword and their coat of arms, encouraged the idea of a natural superiority over the commoners that was common through the Second Estate, and as long as any noble was in possession of a fiefdom, he could collect a tax on the Third Estate called Feudal Dues, which would allegedly be for the Third Estate's protection (though this only applied to serfs and tenants of farmland owned by the nobility). Overall, the Second Estate had vast privileges that the Third Estate did not possess, which in effect protected the Second Estate's wealth and property, while hindering the Third Estate's ability to advance. The reforms proposed by Turgot and argued against in the protests of the Parlement of Paris conflicted with the Second Estates' interests to keep their hereditary privileges, and was the first step toward reform that seeped into the political arena. Turgot's reforms were unpopular among the commoners as well, who saw the parlements as their best defense against the power of the monarchy.

List of parlements and sovereign councils of the Kingdom of France
 1789

Judicial proceedings
In civil trials, judges had to be paid épices (literally "spices" – fees) by the parties, to pay for legal advice taken by the judges, and the costs of their staff. Judges were not allowed to ask for, or receive, épices from the poor.

Regarding criminal justice, the proceedings were markedly archaic. Judges could order suspects to be tortured in order to extract confessions or induce them to reveal the names of their accomplices: there were the question ordinaire ("ordinary questioning"), the ordinary form of torture, and the question extraordinaire ("extraordinary questioning"), with increased brutality. There was little presumption of innocence if the suspect was a mere poor commoner. The death sentence could be pronounced for a variety of crimes including mere theft; depending on the crime and the social class of the victim, death could be by decapitation with a sword (for nobles), hanging (for most of the secondary crimes by commoners), the breaking wheel (for some heinous crimes by commoners). Some crimes, such as regicide, exacted even more horrific punishment, as drawing and quartering. With the spread of enlightenment ideas throughout France, most forms of judicial torture had fallen out of favor, and while they remained on the books, were rarely applied after 1750.

Ultimately, judicial torture and cruel methods of executions were abolished in 1788 by King Louis XVI.

Abolition

The parlements were abolished by the National Constituent Assembly on 6 September 1790. The behavior of the parlements is one of the reasons that since the French Revolution, French courts have been forbidden by Article 5 of the French civil code to create law and act as legislative bodies, their only mandate being to interpret the law.  France, through the Napoleonic Code, was at the origin of the modern system of civil law, in which precedents are not as powerful as in countries of common law. The origin of the separation of powers in the French court system, with no rule of precedent outside the interpretation of the law, no single supreme court and no constitutional review of statutes by courts until 1971 (by action, before the Constitutional Council of France created in 1958) and 2010 (by exception, before any court) is usually traced to that hostility towards "government by judges".

Explanatory notes

References

Further reading
 Cobban, Alfred. "The Parlements of France in the eighteenth century." History 35.123 (1950): 64–80.
 Collins, James B. The state in early modern France (Cambridge University Press, 1995)
 Doyle, William.  "The Parlements of France and the Breakdown of the Old Regime 1771–1788." French Historical Studies (1970): 415–458 in JSTOR.
 Holt, Mack P. "The King in Parliament: The Problem of the Lit de Justice in Sixteenth-Century France" Historical Journal (September 1988) 31#3 pp :507–523).
 Holt, Mack P., ed. Society and Institutions in Early Modern France (1991)
 Hurt, John J. Louis XIV and the Parlements: The Assertion of Royal Authority (Manchester University Press, 2002) online
 Jones, Colin. The Great Nation: France from Louis XV to Napoleon (2003)
 Ladurie, Emmanuel Le Roy. The Ancien Regime: A History of France, 1610–1774  (1998)

In French
  Bluche, François.  L'Ancien régime: Institutions et société.  Collection: Livre de poche.  Paris: Fallois, 1993. 
  Jouanna, Arlette and Jacqueline Boucher, Dominique Biloghi, Guy Thiec.  Histoire et dictionnaire des Guerres de Religion.  Collection: Bouquins.  Paris: Laffont, 1998. 
  Pillorget, René and Suzanne Pillorget.  France Baroque, France Classique 1589-1715. Collection: Bouquins.  Paris: Laffont, 1995. 
  Saint-Bonnet, François. "Le contrôle a posteriori : les parlements de l'Ancien Régime et la neutralisation de la loi". Les Cahiers du Conseil constitutionnel, No 28 (2010).

 

Ancien Régime
French Revolution
Kingdom of France
Political history of the Ancien Régime